Jason Walsh is a Paralympic athletics competitor from Australia.  He won a  bronze medal at the 1988 Seoul Games in the Men's 400 m B3 event.

References

Paralympic athletes of Australia
Athletes (track and field) at the 1988 Summer Paralympics
Paralympic bronze medalists for Australia
Living people
Medalists at the 1988 Summer Paralympics
Year of birth missing (living people)
Paralympic medalists in athletics (track and field)
Australian male sprinters
Visually impaired sprinters
Paralympic sprinters